Tossaphol Chomchon (born 9 December 1989) is a Thai professional footballer who plays as a centre-back for Thai League 2 club Ayutthaya United.

Honours

Club
BG Pathum United
 Thai League 1 (1): 2020–21

References

External links

1989 births
Living people
Tossaphol Chomchon
Tossaphol Chomchon
Association football central defenders
Tossaphol Chomchon
Tossaphol Chomchon
Tossaphol Chomchon
Tossaphol Chomchon